Events in the year 2018 in Luxembourg.

Incumbents
Monarch: Henri
Prime Minister: Xavier Bettel

Events
October – scheduled time for the Luxembourg general election, 2018.

Deaths

27 January – Niki Bettendorf, politician (b. 1936).

16 May – Camille Gira, politician (b. 1958)

3 June – Gilbert Trausch, historian (b. 1931).

21 July – , Roman Catholic curialist, Vice President of the Pontifical Commission Ecclesia Dei (b. 1938).

References

 
2010s in Luxembourg
Years of the 21st century in Luxembourg
Luxembourg
Luxembourg